Nuestra Belleza Nuevo León 2012, was held at Las Lomas Eventos in Monterrey, Nuevo León on July 11, 2012. At the conclusion of the final night of competition Cynthia Duque from Monterrey was crowned the winner. Duque was crowned by outgoing Nuestra Belleza Nuevo León titleholder Ivette García. Eight contestants competed for the title.

Results

Placements

Special Awards

Judges
Vero Solís - Fashion Designer
Anagabriela Espinoza - Miss International 2009 & TV Hostess
Perla Beltrán - Nuestra Belleza Mundo México 2008
Nora Salinas - Actress
Ana Laura Corral - National Coordinator of Nuestra Belleza México
Arturo Carmona - Actor
Jaime Campos - Photographer

Background Music
Roke
Ernesto D'Alessio
Circo Pop

Contestants

References

External links
Official Website

Nuestra Belleza México